Ahmad Subagja Baasith (born 15 June 1996) is an Indonesian professional footballer who plays as a defensive midfielder for Liga 2 club PSIM Yogyakarta.

Club career

Persib Bandung
Baasith made his professional debut in the Liga 1 on April 22, 2017 against PS TNI.

Persela Lamongan
In January 2018, Baasith signed a contract with Indonesian Liga 1 club Persela Lamongan. He made his league debut on 24 March 2018 in a match against Persipura Jayapura at the Mandala Stadium, Jayapura.

PSIM Yogyakarta
In 2020, Baasith signed a one-year contract with Indonesian Liga 2 club PSIM Yogyakarta. This season was suspended on 27 March 2020 due to the COVID-19 pandemic. The season was abandoned and was declared void on 20 January 2021.

References

External links 
 
 Ahmad Baasith at Liga Indonesia

Living people
1996 births
Sportspeople from Bandung
Indonesian footballers
Association football midfielders
Liga 1 (Indonesia) players
Persib Bandung players
Persela Lamongan players